Open Problems in Mathematics is a book, edited by John Forbes Nash Jr. and Michael Th. Rassias, published in 2016 by Springer. The book consists of seventeen expository articles, written by outstanding researchers, on some of the central open problems in the field of mathematics. The book also features an Introduction on John Nash: Theorems and Ideas, by Mikhail Leonidovich Gromov. According to the editors’ Preface, each article is devoted to one open problem or a “constellation of related problems”.

Choice of problems 
Nash and Rassias write in the preface of the book that the open problems presented “were chosen for a variety of reasons. Some were chosen for their undoubtable importance and applicability, others because they constitute intriguing curiosities which remain unexplained mysteries on the basis of current knowledge and techniques, and some for more emotional reasons. Additionally, the attribute of a problem having a somewhat vintage flavor was also influential” in their decision process.

Table of contents
 Preface, by John F. Nash Jr. and Michael Th. Rassias 
 A Farewell to “A Beautiful Mind and a Beautiful Person”, by Michael Th. Rassias
 Introduction, John Nash: Theorems and Ideas, by Mikhail Leonidovich Gromov
 P =? NP, by Scott Aaronson
 From Quantum Systems to L-Functions: Pair Correlation Statistics and Beyond, by Owen Barrett, Frank W. K. Firk, Steven J. Miller, and Caroline Turnage-Butterbaugh 
 The Generalized Fermat Equation, by Michael Bennett, Preda Mihăilescu, and Samir Siksek 
 The Conjecture of Birch and Swinnerton-Dyer, by John H. Coates 
 An Essay on the Riemann Hypothesis, by Alain Connes 
 Navier–Stokes Equations: A Quick Reminder and a Few Remarks, by Peter Constantin 
 Plateau’s Problem, by Jenny Harrison and Harrison Pugh 
  The Unknotting Problem, by Louis Kauffman 
 How Can Cooperative Game Theory Be Made More Relevant to Economics?: An Open Problem, by Eric Maskin 
 The Erdős–Szekeres Problem, by Walter Morris and Valeriu Soltan 
 Novikov’s Conjecture, by Jonathan Rosenberg 
 The Discrete Logarithm Problem, by René Schoof
 Hadwiger’s Conjecture, by Paul Seymour 
 The Hadwiger–Nelson Problem, by Alexander Soifer 
 Erdős’s Unit Distance Problem, by Endre Szemerédi 
 Goldbach’s Conjectures: A Historical Perspective, by Robert Charles Vaughan
  The Hodge Conjecture'', by Claire Voisin

References 

2016 non-fiction books
Books about mathematics
Unsolved problems in mathematics